Umbilicaria maculata is a species of saxicolous (rock-dwelling) umbilicate lichen in the family Umbilicariaceae. It is found in high-altitude alpine locations in Poland and France.

Taxonomy
Umbilicaria maculata was formally described as a new species in 2009 by Beata Krzewicka, María Paz Martín, and Miguel Angel García.

Description
The thallus of Umbilicaria maculata is monophyllous, meaning that it consists of a single more or less orbicular, flattened, leafy lobe with a single point of attachment to the substrate. The thallus undersurface is also smooth and dull, with a pale creamy to white colour that darkens towards the edges. The medulla is white and comprises two layers: a loose upper part with a webby (arachnoidal) plectenchyma, and a more compact plectenchyma in the lower part.

Apothecia (spore-bearing structures) are black and about 1 mm in diameter; they have an apothecial disc with central column of sterile tissue (omphalodisc) and a fissure in the centre. The asci are club-shaped (clavate), contain eight spores, and measure 40–45 by 10–15 μm. Ascospores are hyaline and with dimensions of 10–12 by 5–6 μm.

Habitat and distribution
Umbilicaria maculata grows on the vertical faces of siliceous rocks in alpine and subnival habitats, preferring locations that are shaded and exposed to wind. The authors call the lichen "extremely rare", but acknowledge that its true distribution is not well understood because of potential confusion with the lookalike Umbilicaria cylindrica.

References

maculata
Lichen species
Lichens described in 2009
Lichens of Southwestern Europe
Lichens of Central Europe